The 2019 BOSS GP season was the 25th season of the BOSS GP series. The championship began on 28 April at Hockenheim and finished on 13 October at Imola.

Teams and Drivers

Calendar

 Round 1 was originally scheduled for 27 April, but was postponed due to heavy rain.

Championship standings
 Points for both championships were awarded as follows:

Drivers Standings

References

External links
 

Boss GP
Boss GP